Jingde County is a county in the southeast of Anhui Province, People's Republic of China, under the jurisdiction of the prefecture-level city of Xuancheng City. The government of Jingde County is located in Jingyang Town.

Jingde County has jurisdiction over five towns and five townships.

Administrative divisions
Jingde County is divided to 5 towns and 5 townships.
Towns

Townships

Climate

References

County-level divisions of Anhui
Xuancheng